Cornish grammar is the grammar of the Cornish language ( or ), an insular Celtic language closely related to Breton and Welsh and, to a lesser extent, to Irish, Manx and Scottish Gaelic. It was the main medium of communication of the Cornish people for much of their history until the 17th century, when a language shift occurred in favour of English. A revival, however, started in 1904, with the publication of A Handbook of the Cornish Language, by Henry Jenner, and since then there has been a growing interest in the language.

Initial consonant mutation 
Initial mutation is a feature shared by all the modern Celtic languages, in which the initial consonant of a word may change under some circumstances. In Cornish these changes take place when a word starts with one of the consonants shown in the table below; other initial consonants remain unchanged. The most common mutation occurs after the definite article an, when followed by a feminine singular noun or masculine plural noun.

1 Before unrounded vowels (i, y, e, a), l, and r + unrounded vowel.
2 Before rounded vowels (o, u), and r + rounded vowel.

Nouns

Gender 
Cornish nouns, like those of other Celtic languages, possess grammatical gender, meaning that they belong to one of two groups: masculine or feminine. Sometimes the gender of a noun can be inferred from the class of words it belongs to, for example, nouns referring to males, such as  “man, husband” or  “bull”, or verbal nouns, such as  “walking” and  “being”, are masculine whereas nouns referring to females, such as  “sister” and  “hen”, are feminine. Nevertheless, it is often impossible to determine the gender of a noun from its form, although certain nominal suffixes have gender:

 Masculine suffixes: , /, //,  (mostly), 

There is a very small number of nouns which may be either gender, such as  “heaven” and  “grassland”, and is similar to its sister language Breton in that the noun  “thing” takes masculine numerals above one and masculine referring pronouns but has the mutations of a feminine noun after  “the”,  “one” and on accompanying adjectives.

Number

Singular and plural 
Most nouns have a singular and plural form, the latter deriving from the former in a number of ways.

Dual 
A small number of nouns display relics of a dual system. These are formed by prefixing masculine  or feminine , both “two”, to the respective noun. Dual nouns are often parts of the body and indicate the pair of them taken together, for instance,  “eye” to  “(pair of) eyes” and  “arm” to  “(pair of) arm”.

Collective and singulative 
A distinctive and unusual feature of Brythonic languages is that of collective and singulative number. The base form of some Cornish nouns denotes a class or group, often natural objects, such as  “pine trees”,  “flies” and  “fog”. A singulative is formed by adding the feminine ending  to denote a single individual of the group, hence  “a pine tree”,  “a fly” and  “a patch of fog”.

Determiners

Articles 
Cornish lacks an indefinite article (although  “one” is sometimes used to mean ”a certain...” e.g.  “a certain dog”), but has a definite article, which precedes the noun, for example  “the Cornishman” and  “the Cornishwomen”. The article causes a soft mutation on feminine singular nouns, such as  “Cornishwoman” to  “the Cornishwoman”, and on masculine plural nouns denoting persons, as  “Cornishmen” to  “the Cornishmen”, although exceptions to the latter include  “the fathers” and clear English borrowings such as  “the doctors”. Also the masculine plural nouns  ”stones” and  ”horses” are exceptions, which are lenited to  ”the stones” and  ”the horses”, respectively.  is shortened to  after certain function words that end in a vowel, meaning  “of”,  “to” and  “and” become  “of the”,  “to the” and  “and the”, and in addition,  “in” becomes identically pronounced  “in the”.

Demonstrative determiners 

Possessive determiners 
The possessive determiners are as follows. Notice their similarity to the more reduced forms of the infixed personal pronouns.

Pronouns

Personal pronouns 
Personal pronouns in Cornish can be arranged as follows.

Independent personal pronouns are used as the subject of a nominal sentence, for example  “I believe”, or can stand before the verb in a verbal sentence to draw attention to the subject implied by the verb, for example  “We cannot go”. Certain other constructions employ independent pronouns, such as those based on verbal nouns, like  “(that) he came here”, and those that follow conjunctions, such as  “as they are/were waiting”.

Suffixed pronouns are attached to nouns in possessive constructions, to inflected verbs and to pronouns and are used to reinforce a pronoun previously expressed by a verbal or personal ending, for example  “Where did she go?”.

Infixed pronouns are used between a verbal particle and a verb, such as in  “if I don't see you”.

Demonstrative pronouns 
Demonstrative pronouns display two degrees of proximity as well as gender and number.

These pronouns lose their final  before  “is” and  “was”, for example  “This is my (female) cousin”.

Adjectives 
Cornish adjectives usually come after the noun they modify although a few may come before or after, such as  “bad” and  “full”, and a small number always precede the noun, such as  “many” and  “old, long-standing”. There are simple and derived adjectives. Adjectives are lenited when they are preceded by a feminine singular noun, or a masculine plural noun referring to persons, e.g. 'an old woman',  'small sons'.

Comparison 
A number of adjectives are irregular and have separate comparative and superlative forms.

Used in place names.

Adverbs 
Adverbials in Cornish may be a single word or a more complex phrases, for example  “then” and  “now”, literally “in this hour”. Adverbs can be formed from adjectives by means of the particle  “then”, such as in the case of  “strong” to  “strongly” and  “good” to  “well”.

Verbs

Regular conjugation 
Cornish verbs are highly regular and are conjugated to show distinctions of person, number, mood, tense and aspect in various combinations. An example conjugation of  “buy” is given in the following tables.

Certain points should be observed about the above:

The final consonant of a verb stem is modified before subjunctive endings.

Certain verbs take slightly different endings in the indicative imperfect.

The third person singular indicative present/future and the second person imperative utilise the verbal stem with no ending.

The impersonal form is equivalent to the use of the English pronoun one and can be used in a similar way to the English passive, for example,  “One bought the food; The food was bought”.

The infinitive form is considered to be a verbal noun in Cornish grammars, meaning an example like  can function as both verbal “to buy” and nominal “(the act of) buying”. A number of different verbal noun endings exist.

It should also be noted that vowel affection occurs in the stem of some verbs before certain endings, especially those with close front vowels, though not exclusively. The following table highlights how affection works with  “touch”.

Note:

The alternative indicative imperfect endings ,  and  cause vowel affection.

Amongst the endingless forms, the present/future third person singular and the second person singular imperative, the former may include vowel affection while the latter does not, for example,  “sound” to  “he/she/it sounds” and  “sound!” and  “call” to  “he/she/it calls” and  “call!”.

The alternative third person singular and impersonal preterite ending  causes vowel affection.

These endings also cause affection with some verbs.

Certain verbal noun endings cause vowel affection, again especially those with close front vowels.

Irregular conjugation 
A handful of irregular verbs exist, the most common of which are detailed here.

The most irregular verb of all is  “be”, which is often used as an auxiliary and can be conjugated to show a number of additional distinctions not present in other verbs.

The present tense has separate short and long forms. The short forms are used when a subject complement is a noun or adjective whereas the long forms are used with adverbial and participle complements. In addition, the imperfect has a habitual form.

The form  is not found independently but rather in its mutated form  as part of compound words, such as  “known” and  “owned”.

A similar construction is present in Breton. The presence of the pronoun means there are separate masculine and feminine third person singular forms but no impersonal forms, verbal noun or participles.

The irregular verb  (or ) “know, can (know how to)” is based upon  although does not utilise a habitual imperfect.

Another extremely common irregular verb also used as an auxiliary is  “do, make”.

The verb  “go, become” is irregular and has separate forms for the present perfect.

Similarly,  “come, arrive” is irregular and has present perfect forms.

The irregular verbs  “give” and  “bring” (alternatively,  and ) have similar conjugations.

Conjunctions 
Certain conjunctions have an additional form used when followed by a vowel, such as  “and” becoming  and  “than” becoming .

Prepositions 
As in other Celtic languages, Cornish prepositions are simple or complex and may inflect to show person, number and gender. Historically, inflected prepositions derive from the contraction between a preposition and a personal pronoun.

Third person prepositional stems are sometimes slightly different from those of the first and second persons and affection sometimes occurs in the third person singular feminine.  “to” and  “with” are irregular.

Complex prepositions inflect by means of interfixes, whereby the nominal second element is preceded by a pronominal form. This is similar to how  can become  in archaic English. Mutations may be triggered following the various pronominal forms as seen in the following table.

Numbers

Cardinal numbers 
Similar to other Celtic languages, Cornish has an underlying vigesimal counting system. “Two”, “three” and “four” and derivative numbers have separate masculine (m.) and feminine (f.) forms.

The numbers 21 to 39 employ the connective  “on the” to join the smaller number to the larger, for example  “21”,  “29” and  “31”. From 41 onwards, the connecting word is  “and”, as in  “41”,  “55” and  “99”.

Cardinal numbers used to form larger numbers include:

Ordinal numbers 
Ordinal numbers and their abbreviations are shown below. The majority of numbers employ the ordinal suffix .

Larger numbers also employ the suffix .

In multi-word numbers, the initial smaller number joined with the connector takes the ordinal form, for example  “21st” and  “99th” (not  or ). In multiword numbers that are not joined by connecting words, the final number takes the ordinal form, for example  “40th”,  “120th”,  “3,000th”.

Word order and focus 

The default Cornish word order is verb–subject–object, although like most Celtic languages this is somewhat fluid. Cornish has a system of fronting constituents, in which parts of a sentence can be moved to the front for focus, rather than stressing them in situ as English does. This system has influenced the Anglo-Cornish dialect, heard in the distinctive questioning of dialect speakers such as “Goin’ in’ town are’ee?” and “’S bleddy ’tis”.

In description sentences of the verb bos ‘to be’, the complement is typically fronted:

Merryn ov vy.
Merryn am I
I'm Merryn.

Lowen es jy.
Happy were you
You were happy.

Other existence sentences of bos front the verb:

Yma hi ow kortos y’n gegin.
There.is she at wait.VN in.the kitchen
She's waiting in the kitchen.

Yth esa lyver war an estyllen.
VPART there.was book on the shelf
There was a book on the shelf / A book was on the shelf

Since Cornish prefers to use a ‘there is’ existence form of bos with indefinite objects (when not fronted for emphasis, that is), an object being definite or indefinite can result in different parts being fronted:

Y fydh ebost danvenys yn-mes ynno an kedhlow a vri.
VPART will.be email sent out in.it the information of relevance
An email will be sent out containing the relevant information. (literally There’ll be an email sent out)

An ebost a vydh danvenys yn-mes a-vorow.
the email SPART will.be sent out tomorrow
The email will be sent out tomorrow.

Y feu kath gwelys y’n lowarth.
VPART was cat seen in.the garden
A cat was seen in the garden. (literally There was a cat seen)

An gath a veu gwelys y’n lowarth.
the cat SPART was seen in.the garden
The cat was seen in the garden.

With other verbs, subject-fronted is the default unmarked word order. This still follows the default verb–subject–object order, since sentences of this kind were in origin relative clauses emphasising the subject:

My a ros lyver da dhe das Jowan de.
me RPART gave book good to father Jowan yesterday
I gave a good book to Jowan's father yesterday. (literally It is me who gave a good book)

When the sentence's object is a pronoun, it appears before the verb infixed after the particle a, although it can also appear after the verb for emphasis: My a’s gwel ‘I see her’, or My a’s gwel hi “I see her”.
When auxiliary verbs are used, a possessive pronoun is used with the verbal noun: My a wra hy gweles ‘I see her’ (literally “I do her seeing”), or when stressed, My a wra hy gweles hi “I see her”. In both instances, colloquial spoken Cornish may drop all but the suffixed pronouns, to give My a wel hi and My a wra gweles hi, although this is rarely written.

In questions and negative sentences, an interrogative particle and negative particle are used, respectively. These are generally fronted in neutral situations:

A wruss’ta ri an lyver dhodho de?
IPART you.did’you VN.give the book to.him yesterday
Did you give him the book yesterday?

Ny wrug vy ri an lyver dhodho.
NPART I.did VN.give the book to.him
I didn't give him the book.

Subject pronouns can be placed before a negative particle for emphasis: My ny vynnav kewsel Sowsnek ’I will not speak English’ or ’As for me, I will not speak English’ (said to be Dolly Pentreath's last words).

Fronting for emphasis 
Besides the “neutral” structures given above, elements of Cornish sentences can be fronted to give emphasis, or when responding to a question with requested information. Fronting involves moving the element to the beginning of the sentence. English typically achieves this by modifying tone or intonation.

There are two particles involved in fronting. The particle a is actually a relative particle used when the subject or direct object of a sentence is fronted. If anything else is fronted, usually adverbials or information headed by prepositions, the particle used is y (yth before a vowel).

Nominal syntax 
Determiners precede the noun they modify, while adjectives generally follow it. A modifier that precedes its head noun often causes a mutation, and adjectives following a feminine noun are lenited. Thus:
 (”a woman”)
 (”the woman”;  is lenited because it is feminine)
 (”a wicked woman”;  is lenited because  “wicked” precedes it)
 (”a smart woman”;  is lenited because it follows a feminine noun)

Genitive relationships are expressed by apposition. The genitive in Cornish is formed by putting two noun phrases next to each other, the possessor coming second. So English “The cat's mother”, or “mother of the cat”, corresponds to Cornish  – literally, “mother the cat”; “the project manager's telephone number” is  – literally, “number telephone manager the project”. Only the last noun in a genitive sequence can take the definite article.

References 

Williams, N. Desky Kernowek (Evertype, 2012)

Cornish language
Celtic grammars